Scott Scovell Hamilton (born August 28, 1958) is a retired American figure skater and Olympic gold medalist. He won four consecutive U.S. championships (1981–84), four consecutive World Championships (1981–84), and a gold medal in the 1984 Olympics. His signature move, the backflip, a feat few other figure skaters could perform at the time, is against U.S. Figure Skating and Olympic competition rules. Yet, he would include it in his exhibition routines as an amateur to please the crowd. Later, he also used the backflip in his professional competition routines. He is widely recognized for his innovative footwork sequences. In retirement, he has been involved in charitable work and is the author of three books.

Early life and education 
Hamilton was born on August 28, 1958 in Toledo, Ohio. He was adopted at the age of six weeks by Dorothy (née McIntosh), a professor, and Ernest S. Hamilton, a professor of biology, and raised in Bowling Green, Ohio. He has two siblings, older sister Susan (his parents' biological daughter) and younger brother Steven (who was also adopted). He attended Kenwood Elementary School. When Hamilton was two years old, he contracted a mysterious illness that caused him to stop growing. After numerous tests and several wrong diagnoses (including a diagnosis of cystic fibrosis that gave him just six months to live), the disease began to correct itself. His family physician sent him to Boston Children's Hospital to see a Dr. Shwachman. He was told the doctor had no idea what was wrong and to go home and stop the diets in order to live a normal life. Years later, it was determined that a congenital brain tumor was the root cause of his childhood illness.

At age 13, Hamilton began training with Pierre Brunet, a former Olympic champion. In 1976, however, he was almost forced to quit skating because the cost of training was too high and he enrolled in college. However, Helen and Frank McLoraine stepped in to provide financial support for Hamilton to continue his training. Hamilton would later work with the McLoraines in continuing philanthropic support for figure skating. Hamilton attended Bowling Green State University in Ohio.  The former First Street in Bowling Green was named Scott Hamilton Avenue in his honor.

Skating career

In 1980, Hamilton finished third in the U.S. Figure Skating Championships, earning him a place on the U.S. Olympic team.  At this time, Don Laws was coaching him.  He finished in fifth place at the 1980 Winter Olympics, where he also had the honor of carrying the American flag in the opening ceremony. His breakthrough performance was in the 1981 U.S. Championships.  He performed flawlessly and the audience began a standing ovation several seconds before the end of the performance.  He never lost an amateur competition again.  In 1981 he won gold in the World Figure Skating Championships.  During the long program, he received scores of 5.8s and 5.9s for technical merit and 5.7s at 5.9s for artistic impression out of a perfect score of 6.0.  He started the long program off with a triple Lutz jump, his most consistent and hardest jump.  He performed a strong program in spite of a minor flub.  He won gold again in 1982 and 1983 at the U.S. and World Championships.

At the 1984 Olympics, he won the compulsory figures and placed second in the short program.  For the long program, he planned five jumps: a triple Lutz, a triple flip, a triple toe loop in combination with a double loop, a triple toe walley and a triple Salchow.  He completed only three of them, missing the triple flip and the triple Salchow.  For technical merit, the nine judges gave him three 5.6's, two 5.7's, three 5.8's and a 5.9. For artistic impression, he received four 5.8's and five 5.9's.   Brian Orser won the long program and Hamilton was second, but Hamilton won the gold medal, because Orser was too far back in the overall standings to catch Hamilton after placing 7th in the compulsory figures, which at the time accounted for 30% of the total score. Hamilton’s victory ended a 24-year gold medal drought for US men in Olympic figure skating.  He didn't attempt the triple Axel jump, a more difficult jump which other skaters in the competition landed. He won that year's World Championships and then turned professional in April 1984.

After turning professional, Hamilton toured with the Ice Capades for two years, and then created "Scott Hamilton's American Tour," which later was renamed Stars on Ice.  He co-founded, co-produced and performed in Stars on Ice for 15 years before retiring from the tour in 2001 (though he still returns for occasional guest performances).

He has been awarded numerous skating honors, including being the first solo male figure skater to be awarded the Jacques Favart Award (in 1988). In 1990 he was inducted into the United States Olympic Hall of Fame.

Career in media

Broadcasting career
Hamilton was a skating commentator for CBS television for many years, beginning in 1985.  He has also worked for NBC television. In 2006 he was the host of the FOX television program Skating with Celebrities. He currently serves on the Board of Directors for Special Olympics International.

Television appearances
Hamilton voiced the dog dancing commentator on the King of the Hill episode "Dances with Dogs". He was also seen in the 2008 The Fairly OddParents episode "The Fairy Oddlympics" as Timmy Turner's co-host.

He appeared on the August 26, 2008 episode of Wanna Bet?, where he finished 2nd, losing to Bill Engvall. In 2009, he appeared in the second season of Celebrity Apprentice.

He made a small appearance on Roseanne as himself, participating in a mock linoleum skating competition credit sequence. He also made a brief appearance in the film Blades of Glory.

On March 8, 2010, Scott Hamilton: Return to the Ice premiered on the Bio Channel.  The two-hour television special chronicled Hamilton's return to skating after battling cancer.

Book authorship
In 1999, Hamilton wrote the book Landing It, in which he talks about his life on & off the ice. In 2009, Hamilton wrote the book The Great Eight, which shared the secrets to his happiness and how he overcame numerous challenges and disappointments throughout his life. In 2018, he wrote the book Finish First: Winning Changes Everything (publisher: Thomas Nelson), about the value of competition.

Personal life

Family
On November 14, 2002, he married Tracie Robinson, a nutritionist. The couple have three sons and one daughter.  The family resides in Franklin, Tennessee.

Faith
Hamilton is a Christian and has said about his faith, "I understand that through a strong relationship with Jesus you can endure anything... God is there to guide you through the tough spots. God was there every single time, every single time."

Illnesses
In 1997, Hamilton had a much-publicized battle with testicular cancer. He made a return to skating after his treatment and his story was featured in magazines and on television. It was announced on November 12, 2004, that Hamilton had a benign brain tumor, which was treated at the Cleveland Clinic.

On June 23, 2010, Hamilton had brain surgery to prevent the recurrence of the benign tumor discovered in 2004. Called craniopharyngioma, the tumor could have caused blindness if left untreated. The surgery was successful. In November 2010, Hamilton was in the hospital again. During the removal of the tumor, an artery in the brain was "nicked". The bleeding stopped, but an aneurysm formed days later. Hamilton came through the surgery well.

In 2016, Hamilton announced that he had received his third brain tumor diagnosis. In late March 2017, he stated that the tumor had shrunk without chemo.

Charitable work
In 1990, as the Make-A-Wish Foundation honored its 10th birthday, Hamilton was recognized as the Foundation's first ever "Celebrity Wish Granter of the Year."

He founded the Scott Hamilton Cares Foundation to assist with cancer patient support. He has been a longtime volunteer with the Special Olympics and currently serves as a Special Olympics Global Ambassador. Hamilton has also helped benefit St. Jude's Children's Hospital and the Multiple Myeloma Research Foundation, of which he is an honorary board member.

Political views
In 2012, Hamilton made public appearances in support of the presidential campaign of Republican Mitt Romney. He has also spoken in support of Donald Trump, and appeared in an episode of Celebrity Apprentice.

Awards and recognition 
1985 – Hamilton was presented the 1984 Most Courageous Athlete Award by the Philadelphia Sports Writers Association.
1993 - The Associated Press released results of a national sports study in which Hamilton ranked as one of the top eight most popular athletes in America, ranking far ahead of big-name sports stars such as Michael Jordan, Magic Johnson, Troy Aikman, Dan Marino, Wayne Gretzky, Joe Montana, and Nolan Ryan.
1996 - Hamilton was presented the United States Sports Academy's Mildred "Babe" Didrikson Zaharias Courage Award in recognition of his courageous action in overcoming adversity to excel in sport.
1996 - Hamilton received the Academy of Achievement Golden Plate Award.

Programs

Competition results

References

Further reading

External links

 
 
 
 
 
 
 

1958 births
Living people
American adoptees
American male single skaters
Bowling Green State University alumni
Figure skaters at the 1980 Winter Olympics
Figure skaters at the 1984 Winter Olympics
Figure skating commentators
Hononegah Community High School alumni
Olympic Games broadcasters
Olympic figure skaters of the United States
Olympic gold medalists for the United States in figure skating
Participants in American reality television series
Sportspeople from Toledo, Ohio
World Figure Skating Championships medalists
Medalists at the 1984 Winter Olympics
People from Bowling Green, Ohio
American autobiographers
Writers from Ohio
The Apprentice (franchise) contestants